Oleg Engachev (born 1967) is a Russian-born shooter who competes for Qatar.

Shooting Competitions
In 2014 he won the 25 m center fire pistol event at the Asian Games.

Personal life
Engachev is married, and has two children.

References

1967 births
Living people
Qatari male sport shooters
Naturalised citizens of Qatar
Asian Games medalists in shooting
Shooters at the 2014 Asian Games
Asian Games gold medalists for Qatar
Medalists at the 2014 Asian Games